Konstantin Pilipchuk (born 20 December 1986) is a Russian male acrobatic gymnast medalled at five Acrobatic Gymnastics World Championships. In partnership with Alexei Dudchenko, he is a two-times world champion in men's pairs, winning in the 2012 and 2014. He won silver medals at the 2006, 2008 and 2010. Along with Dudchenko, he also won silver medal on the 2009 World Games, gold medal on the 2013 World Games and is a four-time European champion.

He was one of Rostov's torchbearers in the 2014 Winter Olympics torch relay.

References

External links 

 

1986 births
Living people
Russian acrobatic gymnasts
Male acrobatic gymnasts
World Games gold medalists
World Games silver medalists
Competitors at the 2009 World Games
Competitors at the 2013 World Games
Medalists at the Acrobatic Gymnastics World Championships
21st-century Russian people